Kyle Dixon may refer to:

 Kyle Dixon (lacrosse) (born 1984), American lacrosse player
 Kyle Dixon (footballer) (born 1994), English footballer
 Kyle Dixon, member of the U.S. band Survive